Chronic undermining burrowing ulcer  is a cutaneous condition that is a postoperative, progressive bacterial gangrene. It is seen in immunocompromised individuals, mostly after post abdominal surgery and rapidly spreads to involve a large area.

See also 
 Skin lesion

References 

Gangrene
Bacterium-related cutaneous conditions